The list of ship launches in 1702 includes a chronological list of some ships launched in 1702.


References

1702
Ship launches